Pewsey railway station serves the village of Pewsey in the county of Wiltshire, England. The average journey time to Paddington from Pewsey is just over an hour. Services between Pewsey and Bedwyn, the next station up the line, are infrequent, most eastbound services next calling at Hungerford, Newbury or Reading instead. This is because  Bedwyn was the most westerly point of the Network SouthEast on this line, while Pewsey was an InterCity station.

History
On 2 July 1906 the line became part of the Reading to Taunton line following the opening of the Castle Cary Cut-Off.

The railway was operated from the start by the Great Western Railway and had been built using its  broad gauge, but in 1874 it was converted to  standard gauge. Initially it was just a single track with a platform on the south side. A signal box was situated on the west end of the eastbound platform; it was replaced by a larger signal box in 1933 but this was closed in 1966.

By 2015 this bridge was in poor condition and was itself replaced by Network Rail with a new, taller, structure incorporating a rainwater drainage system and costing £465,000. In 1984 the old wooden waiting room on the eastbound platform was demolished and replaced by a brick-built shelter. This was built to match the distinctive Berks and Hants style of the original station buildings which still stand on the opposite platform. The following year the station was awarded a First Class award in the Best Preserved Station competition of the Association of Railway Preservation Societies.

The station celebrated its 145th birthday on 9 November 2007. A cake was cut by Pewsey Parish Council chairman, Alex Carder, with First Great Western service delivery manager Alison Stone.

Staff
Trevor Beaven, a long-serving stationmaster who retired in 2020, was awarded an MBE for his services in 1999.

Culture
Pewsey Station is mentioned in the December 2005 film, The Lion, the Witch and the Wardrobe. The train evacuating the Pevensie children from London Paddington stops at a rural station which is identified by the train guard as Pewsey. In actuality, the scene was shot at Highley Station on the preserved Severn Valley Railway. Even so, the film is correct in as much as any train going to Coombe Halt, the ultimate destination of the Pevensie children, would have to pass through Pewsey on its way from London Paddington.

Services

All services at Pewsey are operated by Great Western Railway. Additional services call at Pewsey during the peak periods.

References

Railway stations in Wiltshire
DfT Category D stations
Railway stations in Great Britain opened in 1862
Former Great Western Railway stations
Railway stations served by Great Western Railway
1862 establishments in England